Summer at Eureka is the fourth studio album by Australian rock musician Pete Murray, and became his third album to peak at number 1 on the ARIA Chart. The album also peaked at #19 in New Zealand and #17 in the Netherlands.

Track listing
All tracks by Pete Murray
 "Chance to Say Goodbye" – 4:58
 "Saving Grace" – 2:57
 "You Pick Me Up" – 4:32
 "Silver Cloud" – 4:00
 "This Game" – 3:55
 "Sugar" – 4:30
 "Miss Cold" – 4:04
 "Never Let the End Begin" – 3:01
 "Summer at Eureka" – 3:10
 "King Tide" – 3:06
 "Happy Ground" – 3:50
 "Slack" – 3:24 (iTunes bonus track)

Personnel
Danielle Bentley – cello
Anthony Lycenko – piano, producer, engineer, slide guitar, mixing
Ben McCarthy – acoustic guitar, piano, organ, backing vocals, producer, engineer, mellotron, fender rhodes
Darren Middleton – electric guitar, slide guitar, 12-string acoustic guitar
Pete Murray – acoustic guitar, harmonica, percussion, electric guitar, vocals, producer
Jonathan Zion – bass
Andy Sylvio – percussion

Charts

Weekly charts

Year-end charts

Certifications

References

2008 albums
Pete Murray (Australian singer-songwriter) albums